Stavros Glouftsis (born 20 October 1981 in Etterbeek) is a Greek football striker who is currently playing for ROFC Stockel.

Career
He made his debut in Belgian football for A.F.C. Tubize in 1999 in Belgian Third Division, after which he moved on to a number of clubs (FC Dender, R. Léopold Uccle Forestoise, K.F.C. Rhodienne-Verrewinkel and Tempo Overijse). In 2004, he was snapped up by Verbroedering Geel and made an immediate impact with 10 goals in the Second Division.

After two years he moved to R.A.A. Louviéroise to play in the Belgian First Division. He could not break through and he moved on to R. Union Saint-Gilloise in 2006.

After an unsuccessful stint with Second Division club Royal Antwerp, he moved to Third Division club Willebroek-Meerhof. One year later he moved to K Rupel Boom FC.

Glouftsis was an important part of the team. He was a prolific striker by scoring 27 goals in 1 season.

After narrowly missing out on the Belgian Third Division title with K Rupel Boom FC in 2010, he went to America to go on trial with Major League Soccer team Chicago Fire. On 21 July 2010 Glouftsis signed for second time with Royal Antwerp FC.

After a disappointing season with Royal Antwerp FC, Stavros signed a contract with Belgian Second Division outfit KSK Sint-Niklaas., and after the relegation of the club he signed a 2-year deal with Belgian Second Division side Eendracht Aalst. Glouftsis was fired by Eendracht Aalst after he was convicted to 3 months in jail in a case of theft and the handling of stolen goods.

In August 2014, Glouftsis signed a new contract with Belgian Third Division side KSV Temse

References

External links
 Stavros Glouftsis at Footballdatabase

1981 births
Living people
Belgian footballers
Expatriate footballers in Belgium
A.F.C. Tubize players
F.C.V. Dender E.H. players
R.A.A. Louviéroise players
Royale Union Saint-Gilloise players
Royal Antwerp F.C. players
Association football forwards
K. Rupel Boom F.C. players
S.C. Eendracht Aalst players
Belgian Pro League players
Challenger Pro League players
Belgian people of Greek descent
Greek people of Belgian descent
K.F.C. Rhodienne-De Hoek players
Léopold FC players